Jerrilynn Denise Dodds is an American art historian whose work has focused on artistic identity in Medieval Spain. She is currently a professor of art history at Sarah Lawrence College and formerly served as the dean of the college from 2009 to 2015.

Biography 
Dodds received her B.A. from Barnard College and her M.A. and Ph.D. from Harvard University.

She taught at Columbia University and City College of New York and was distinguished professor at CCNY before joining the faculty of Sarah Lawrence College as dean. She currently holds the Harlequin Adair Dammann Chair at Sarah Lawrence. Her research has focused on the issues of artistic interchange between Christians, Muslims, and Jews in Medieval Spain, and how groups form identities through art and architecture.

Dodds also wrote and directed a number of films on art and architecture, and won a Cine Golden Eagle Award in 1995 for the documentary An Imaginary East.

She is a recipient of a Guggenheim Fellowship in 2016. In 2017, she was awarded the Slade Professorship of Fine Art at the University of Oxford for the 2020–2021 academic year.

References 

Living people
Barnard College alumni
Sarah Lawrence College faculty
Harvard University alumni
American art historians
American university and college faculty deans
Columbia University faculty
City College of New York faculty
Slade Professors of Fine Art (University of Oxford)
Historians of Islamic art
Year of birth missing (living people)